Below is the List of Places named after Khan. Some have been named after a person with Khan (surname) while others are on Khan (title).

Places named Khan 
 Bagh Prachanda Khan, village in Beanibazar, Sylhet district, Bangladesh
 Dera Ghazi Khan, town in Punjab province, Pakistan, named after Ghazi Khan.
 Khan Market a prominent market in the Delhi locality named after Khan Abdul Jabbar Khan, famous for its Sindhi community's shop.
 Khanpur, Delhi locality in Delhi where ITBP training centre is located.
 Khanpur, Gujarat, a village in Mahisagar, district of Gujarat.
 Sarai Kale Khan, a village in Delhi.
 Khan Khana, a village in Punjab where ghazal singer Master Madan was born.
 Idahlu-ye Khan, village in Eastern Azerbaijan Province, Iran.
 Khan Mohammadchah, a village in Sistan-Baluchistan Province, Iran.
 Pind Matay Khan, a village in Punjab Province of Pakistan.
 Khal Khan, a village in Badakshan province of Afghanistan.
 Khan Jleimdun, a village in Hama of Central Syria.
 Khan Yunis, a city in the southeastern part of Gaza.
 Khan Palace, a town located in Bakhchisaray, Crimea.
 Khan Town is a modern planned town suburb in Afghanistan.
 Khan bandar is a border town situated between Afghanistan and Tajikistan.
 Sarukhan is a major village in Ghegharkunik Province of Armenia.
 Fətəli xan is a municipality in Azerbaijan it is named after Fatali Khan Khoyski.
 Rahim Yar Khan is a city in Punjab Province of Pakistan.
 Tando Muhammad Khan is a district Headquarter in Sindh, Pakistan.
 Dera Ismail Khan is a district capital located in Khyber Pakhtunkhwa Province of Pakistan.
 Sardorov Karakhan is a town and Jamoat in Tajikistan.
 Khan River an ephemeral river in Namibia.
 Khan River (India) also spelled Kahn, is a river in Madhya Pradesh state of India.
 Khan (Cambodia) is an administrative unit of Cambodia.
 Khan Shatyr Mountain is a mountain range in Kazakhstan.
 Khan Shaykhun a town in idlib province of Syria
Khan Sen Sok a town in Phnom penh Cambodia
Mohammad Hassan Khan bridge bridge in Babol city of Iran, named after warrior Mohammad Hassan Khan Qajar

See also
 Khan (surname)
 Khan (title)

References

Places by type